Locals Technology Inc., or locals.com, is a creator crowdfunding site cofounded by Dave Rubin and Assaf Lev. It started in 2019 and is based in New York City.

The site was founded after Rubin and Jordan Peterson left Patreon in response to its banning of Carl Benjamin for paraphrasing hate speech. The startup raised just over $1 million from 10 506(b) private placement investors in March 2020. Locals announced further funding of $3.8 million on April 20, 2021 led by Craft Ventures.

The site deviates from the advertising and views model adopted by traditional social media, in favor of a paywall approach that seems to provide several benefits for both creators and consumers according to interviews. 

Assaf Lev is the President and CEO; Lev was previously an executive at QualiSystems. Andrew Conru is also a director.

Locals was acquired by Rumble in October 2021.

Notable creators
 Scott Adams
 Michael Malice
 Dave Rubin
 Tulsi Gabbard
 David Freiheit
 Andy Ngo
 Greg Gutfeld
 Zuby
 Zubin Damania (ZDoggMD)
 Patrick Byrne (previously of Overstock.com; grossing $1.5 million per year in 2021
 Robert Barnes
 Paul Joseph Watson
Kat Timpf
Andrew Gruel
Tammy Bruce
Max Lugavere
Yeonmi Park
Michael Yon
Liz Wheeler
Dan Bongino
Konstantin Kisin
Jedediah Bila
Charlie Kirk
Alan Dershowitz 
Russell Brand
Glenn Greenwald
Steven Crowder

See also
 Thinkspot

References

External links
 

Alt-tech
2019 establishments in New York City
Financial services companies established in 2019
Internet properties established in 2019